Praia Grande (Portuguese meaning "large beach") is a large beach on the northeast coast of the island of São Vicente, Cape Verde. It is 1.5 km northwest of the village Calhau. The white sandy beach is surrounded by volcanic rocks. It is accessible by road from Calhau and Baía das Gatas.

References

External links
Praia Grande on mindelo.info 

Beaches of Cape Verde
Geography of São Vicente, Cape Verde

pt:Praia Grande (Cabo Verde)